Microwave spectroscopy is the spectroscopy method that employs microwaves, i.e. electromagnetic radiation at GHz frequencies, for the study of matter.

History
The ammonia molecule NH3 is shaped like a pyramid 0.38 Å in height, with an equilateral triangle of hydrogens forming the base.The nitrogen situated on the axis has two equivalent equilibrium positions above and below the triangle of hydrogens, and this raises the possibility of the nitrogen tunneling up and down, through the plane of the H-atoms. In 1932 Dennison et al. ... analyzed the vibrational energy of this molecule and concluded that the vibrational energy would be split into pairs by the presence of these two equilibrium positions. The next year Wright and Randall observed ... a splitting of 0.67 cm–1 in far infrared lines, corresponding to ν = 20 GHz, the value predicted by theory.In 1934 Cleeton and Williams ... constructed a grating echelette spectrometer in order to measure this splitting directly, thereby beginning the field of microwave spectroscopy. They observed a somewhat asymmetric absorption line with a maximum at 24 GHz and a full width at half height of 12 GHz.

In molecular physics

In the field of molecular physics, microwave spectroscopy is commonly used to probe the rotation of molecules.

In condensed matter physics
In the field of condensed matter physics, microwave spectroscopy is used to detect dynamic phenomena of either charges or spins at GHz frequencies (corresponding to nanosecond time scales) and energy scales in the µeV regime. Matching to these energy scales, microwave spectroscopy on solids is often performed as a function of temperature (down to cryogenic regimes of a few K or even lower) and/or magnetic field (with fields up to several T).
Spectroscopy traditionally considers the frequency-dependent response of materials, and in the study of dielectrics microwave spectroscopy often covers a large frequency range. In contrast, for conductive samples as well as for magnetic resonance, experiments at a fixed frequency are common (using a highly sensitive microwave resonator), but frequency-dependent measurements are also possible.

Probing charges in condensed matter physics
For insulating materials (both solid and liquid), probing charge dynamics with microwaves is a part of dielectric spectroscopy.
Amongst the conductive materials, superconductors are a material class that is often studied with microwave spectroscopy, giving information about penetration depth (governed by the superconducting condensate), energy gap (single-particle excitation of Cooper pairs), and quasiparticle dynamics.

Another material class that has been studied using microwave spectroscopy at low temperatures are heavy fermion metals with Drude relaxation rates at GHz frequencies.

Probing spins in condensed matter physics
Microwaves impinging on matter usually interact with charges as well as with spins (via electric and magnetic field components, respectively), with the charge response typically much stronger than the spin response. But in the case of magnetic resonance, spins can be directly probed using microwaves. For paramagnetic materials, this technique is called electron spin resonance (ESR) and for ferromagnetic materials ferromagnetic resonance (FMR).
In the paramagnetic case, such an experiment probes the Zeeman splitting, with a linear relation between the static external magnetic field and the frequency of the probing microwave field. A popular combination, as implemented in commercial X-band ESR spectrometers, is approximately 0.3 T (static field) and 10 GHz (microwave frequency) for a typical material with electron g-factor close to 2.

References

Spectroscopy
Molecular physics
Laboratory techniques in condensed matter physics
Superconductivity